The 1975–76 season was the 76th season in the history of Borussia Mönchengladbach. They competed in the Bundesliga, the top tier of German football, the DFB-Pokal and the European Cup. They were German football champions for the fourth time in their history and for the second consecutive season, having won the Bundesliga with 45 points. They were eliminated from the DFB-Pokal at the Round of 16 stage and from the European Cup at the quarter-final stage.

Season summary
Under manager Hennes Weisweiler, Borussia Mönchengladbach won both the Bundesliga and the European Cup in the 1974–75 season, though Weisweiler left the club at the end of the season to manage FC Barcelona, and was replaced by Udo Lattek. With a more cautious style of play than his predecessor, Lattek led the club to their second consecutive Bundesliga title and fourth overall. He also took the club to a European Cup quarter-final against Real Madrid where, after a 2–2 draw at home in the first leg, the club draw 1–1 away on 17 March 1976 which allowed Real to advance to the semi-finals. With the score at 1–1, Mönchengladbach had two goals disallowed, leading to accusations from the Gladbach support that the referee was biased, whilst the club's vice president stated  that "we haven't lost against Real Madrid, but rather the referee."

Competitions

Bundesliga

League table

Matches

DFB-Pokal

European Cup

References

1975–76
German football clubs 1975–76 season
1975–76